Kyle Brownrigg is a Canadian stand-up comedian, most noted for winning the Canadian Comedy Award for Best Breakout Artist at the 19th Canadian Comedy Awards
in 2019.

Originally from Ottawa, Brownrigg began his career at open mic comedy nights in Ottawa. He later moved to Toronto, where he is a regular performer at comedy clubs and shows. He has also performed as a touring comic, at events such as Just for Laughs, JFL Northwest, the Halifax Comedy Festival, the Sudbury Comedy Festival, the 905 Comedy Festival, We're Funny That Way! and the Icebreakers Comedy Festival. He was featured in the 2018 HBO Canada special Homegrown Comics, and the 2020 CBC Gem special The New Wave of Standup, and has appeared on CBC Radio's comedy debate series The Debaters.

In 2018 he was a finalist in SiriusXM Canada's annual Top Comic competition. He released his first comedy album, Unmedicated: The New Fragrance, in 2019.

In 2021, he appeared in an episode of Jon Dore's comedy series Humour Resources. In 2022, his full-length comedy special Kyle Brownrigg: Introducing Lyle, recorded at the 2021 Just for Laughs festival, premiered on Crave. In 2022 he is slated to appear in two episodes of Roast Battle Canada.

Brownrigg is openly gay.

References

External links

21st-century Canadian comedians
Canadian stand-up comedians
Canadian male comedians
Comedians from Ontario
Gay comedians
Canadian Comedy Award winners
People from Ottawa
Living people
Year of birth missing (living people)
Canadian LGBT comedians
21st-century Canadian LGBT people
Canadian gay men